Behind Her Eyes is a British noir supernatural psychological thriller web series created by Steve Lightfoot, based on the 2017 novel of the same name by Sarah Pinborough, that premiered on Netflix on 17 February 2021. The limited series stars Simona Brown, Tom Bateman, Eve Hewson and Robert Aramayo.

Synopsis
Behind Her Eyes follows the story of Louise, a single mother, whose world is thrown off kilter when she begins an affair with her new boss, David, and matters take an even stranger turn when she’s drawn into an unlikely friendship with his wife, Adele. What starts as an unconventional love triangle soon becomes a dark, psychological tale of suspense and twisted revelations, as Louise finds herself caught in a dangerous web of secrets where nothing and no one is what they seem.

Cast and characters
 Simona Brown as Louise Barnsley
 Eve Hewson as Adele Ferguson (née Campbell)
 Tom Bateman as Dr. David Ferguson
 Robert Aramayo as Rob Hoyle
 Tyler Howitt as Adam
 Georgie Glen as Sue
 Nichola Burley as Sophie
 Roshan Seth as Dr. Sharma
  Nila Aalia as Geeta Sharma
 Eva Birthistle as Marianne

Episodes

Production

Development
On 25 January 2019, it was announced that Netflix had given the production a series order for a six-episode first season. Steve Lightfoot is credited as the creator and executive producer of the series. In August 2019, it was announced that Erik Richter Strand would direct the limited series.

Casting
In August 2019, it was confirmed that Simona Brown, Eve Hewson, Tom Bateman and Robert Aramayo would star in the limited series.

Filming
Principal photography for the limited series took place in London and Scotland, from June to October 2019.

Release
On 4 February 2021, Netflix released the official trailer for the limited series. The limited series was released on 17 February 2021.

Reception 
The review aggregator website Rotten Tomatoes reported a 62% approval rating for the first season with an average rating of 5.7/10, based on 37 reviews. The website's critical consensus reads, "Behind Her Eyes''' many twists may be unexpected, but limited character development also leaves them feeling unearned - still, it may be just bonkers enough to keep forgiving viewers entertained." On Metacritic, it has a weighted average score of 54 out of 100, based on 15 critics, indicating "mixed or average reviews".The Guardian stated in their review of the series, “Who knew threesomes could be so boring?”, giving the series a 2-star rating. Rolling Stone stated “Netflix’s new erotic thriller self-destructs with a series of needlessly crazy twists”. The Independent gave the series a 2-star rating, stating “One bizarre twist can’t make up for the yawning lulls”. The Irish Times gave a mostly negative review stating “You may be charmed. Or it’s possible you will wonder why you wasted six hours of your life.” Patrick Cremona from Radio Times'' said of the series, that it “flits from the bland to the bizarre without being particularly convincing or compelling”.

References

External links
 
 

2021 British television series debuts
2021 British television series endings
2020s British television miniseries
British supernatural television shows
British thriller television series
Psychological thriller television series
Dark fantasy television series
Murder in television
English-language Netflix original programming
Television shows based on British novels
Psychological thriller web series
Thriller web series
Television series by Left Bank Pictures
Television series by Sony Pictures Television